Roia or ROIA may refer to:
 Roia (Kiba), a character in the anime Kiba
 Roia (river), a river in Italy and France
 Radio One (company), an American broadcasting corporation
 Râoaia River, a river in Romania
 Restoration of Order in Ireland Act 1920
 Rural Oahu Interscholastic Association

See also
 Roya (disambiguation)